Progresso Associação do Sambizanga is an Angolan football club based in Luanda. The club was founded in 1975, as a result of a merger of three clubs: Juventude Unida do Bairro Alfredo (JUBA), Juventista and Vaza.

Progresso do Sambizanga is notably the only club in Girabola to maintain a women's soccer team, even without official competition. They play their home games at the state-owned Estádio da Cidadela.

History
The club made its debut in the Girabola in 1981 and won their only cup title in 1996 after defeating Primeiro de Agosto and qualified into the 1997 CAF Winners' Cup where they challenged with Gabon's FC 105 Libreville and won a goal in the first leg and lost 2–0 in the last, this was their only appearance in the continental competition.

In the 1980s, the club expanded its international relations, Progresso Sambizanga was the first African club to play in the legendary Maracanã in Rio de Janeiro.

One of the friendly pre-season matches were in 2012 where they played in Brazil in the Toca de Raposa I with the two popular clubs Cruzeiro and Atlético Mineiro.

Progresso do Sambizanga was the first African team to play in the Estádio do Maracaña. That occurred in the 1990s at the time when the team was on campus in a 1-2 loss to a team of retired Brazilian footballers.

Honours
Angola Cup: 1
1996
Runner-up: (1) 2016

Recent seasons
Progresso do Sambizanga's season-by-season performance since 2011:

League and cup positions

Stadium
Progresso do Sambizanga is the owner of Campo Mário Santiago. Located in the club's home neighborhood of Sambizanga, the 8,000-seat stadium whose rehabilitation began in 1996 with private funding and stopped afterwards for lack of funding, resumed in 2016 under a sponsorship deal with the Fundação Eduardo dos Santos (FESA). The stadium's capacity is expected to be increased to 18,000 seats, following the 18-month-long rehabilitation.

Uniform and home kit evolution
Its uniform color has a yellow-black striped clothing with black sleeves and socks and black-yellow striped socks used for home games.
Its former uniform was a yellow-black striped shirt with yellow stripe on each side and had striped sleeves and black shorts.

Performance in CAF competitions
CAF Cup Winners' Cup: 1 appearance
1997 – First Round
 FC 105 Libreville 1–0, 2–0

Players and staff

Players

Staff

Manager history and performance

Progresso do Sambizanga Women's Football
When it comes to women's football in Angola, Progresso do Sambizanga is undeniably a benchmark and a force to reckon with. Until the mid 2000s when regular competitions were organized, the club has won most titles in contest. While no regular competition are being played at present both at provincial and national level, the club still maintains its women's team with regular practice.

Achievements
 Angola League: 4 
2005, 2006, 2007, 2008
 Angolan Cup: 6 
2000, 2001, 2002, 2003, 2004, 2005
 Super Cup: 1 
2000

Other sports
 Handball
 Basketball

See also
 Girabola
 Women's League
 Gira Angola

References

External links
 Girabola.com profile
 Zerozero.pt profile

 
Football clubs in Luanda
Sports clubs in Angola
Association football clubs established in 1975
1975 establishments in Angola